R-5 regional road is a Montenegrin roadway.

It serves as a connection between Rožaje and Peć, Kosovo.

History

In January 2016, the Ministry of Transport and Maritime Affairs published bylaw on categorisation of state roads. With new categorisation, previous R-8 regional road was renamed as R-5 regional road.

Major intersections

References

R-5